Aralar may refer to:
Aralar Range, a mountain range
Aralar (Basque political party), a political party